Freddie Washington (c. 1900 in Houston – ?) was an American jazz pianist.

Washington moved to California around the year 1918, where he joined Kid Ory's band in 1921. He recorded with Ory's band, and it is for his role in these sessions that he is primarily known. He led his own band in the 1920s and 1930s, in addition to playing with Ed Garland and Paul Howard. He recorded on Capitol Records in 1944 with Zutty Singleton, and performed with Kid Ory's band on a live broadcast of the wartime variety show The Orson Welles Almanac (July 12, 1944). Washington continued playing into the 1960s.

References

"Freddie Washington". Grove Jazz online.
John Chilton, Who's Who of Jazz.

American jazz pianists
American male pianists
Musicians from Houston
Jazz musicians from Texas
American male jazz musicians